Oleg Olegovich Yashin (born 3 December 1990) is a Russian professional ice hockey player who is currently an unrestricted free agent who most recently played for GKS Katowice of the Polska Hokej Liga.

Yashin has previously played in the Kontinental Hockey League for Atlant Moscow Oblast, Lokomotiv Yaroslavl, HC Yugra, Kunlun Red Star and Severstal Cherepovets.

His father Oleg Yashin (born 1968) was a forward of Khimik Voskresensk and Fort Wayne Komets.

References

External links
 

1990 births
Living people
Atlant Moscow Oblast players
GKS Katowice (ice hockey) players
HC Kunlun Red Star players
HC Ryazan players
HC Yugra players
Lokomotiv Yaroslavl players
People from Voskresensk
Rubin Tyumen players
Russian ice hockey left wingers
Severstal Cherepovets players
Sportspeople from Moscow Oblast